The 1958 Rhode Island gubernatorial election was held on November 4, 1958. Republican nominee Christopher Del Sesto defeated Democratic incumbent Dennis J. Roberts with 50.06% of the vote.

Primary elections
Primary elections were held on September 17, 1958.

Democratic primary

Candidates
Dennis J. Roberts, incumbent Governor
Armand H. Cote, incumbent Lieutenant Governor

Results

General election

Candidates
Christopher Del Sesto, Republican
Dennis J. Roberts, Democratic

Results

References

1958
Rhode Island
Gubernatorial